Matienzo is the name of a village and a karst depression some 25 km southeast of Santander in Ruesga municipality, Cantabria, northern Spain. The limestone around Matienzo is riddled with caves (up to 58.6 km in length) which have been extensively explored over the last 50 years by Spanish and British cavers. The total length of cave passage explored, as of December 2016, is 377 km.

References

External links 
Matienzo Caves site Information about the area, more than 4000 caves, research details, cave surveys and thousands of photos], www.matienzocaves.org
Matienzo: 50 Years of Speleology Cave exploration, cave diving, geology, archaeology, geomorphology and personal recollections, dual language overview of 50 years of speleology in and around Matienzo], www.rrcpc.org.uk

Populated places in Cantabria
Caves of Cantabria